K.K. Ragesh is an Indian politician and member of the Communist Party of India (Marxist). He was elected as a member of the Rajya Sabha the Upper house of Indian Parliament from Kerala in 2015. He was earlier the president of the Students Federation of India In 2020, he received Parliamentary Group for Children (PGC) Award for the commendable work done in the parliament for the protection of the rights of children and students.

On 21 September 2020, Ragesh along with seven other members were suspended from the Rajya Sabha for their unruly behavior in the house by tearing documents, breaking mic and heckling the Deputy Chairman of the Rajya Sabha. Their actions were condemned by several leaders.

In May 2021, Ragesh has been appointed as the private secretary to the Chief Minister of Kerala.

In 2022 February, K K Ragesh has been nominated for the 'Sansad Ratna' award under the 'retired members in 2021' category for his outstanding performance during his full term in Rajya Sabha.

References

https://www.ndtv.com/india-news/sansad-ratna-award-ncps-supriya-sule-among-11-mps-to-be-conferred-with-sansad-ratna-awards-2782115

External links
 K.K. Ragesh Rajya Sabha Biography

1970 births
Living people
Communist Party of India (Marxist) politicians from Kerala
Rajya Sabha members from Kerala
Students' Federation of India All India Presidents